

Company
Endofa is a physical gasoil supplier and bunker trader with offices in Houston and Dubai.
The company started its first physical bunker supply operation at the end of 2012. The company is a physical supplier and cargo trader of gasoil in West Africa, mainly from Walvis Bay and up to Congo.

Endofa is owned and operate by three Danish partners, Kenn Soendergaard, Mads Borggaard, and Allan Frost.
As a bunker supplier and trader, Endofa reported a turnover of $235 million, more than doubling its first-year projections.  The company expects to expand its current fleet of seven vessels and projects a 2014 turnover of $350 million.

Partnerships and expansion

On May 14, 2014, Marine fuel supplier and trader Endofa says it has expanded its operations into Central America through a joint venture with Latin American player Uno. Product will be delivered ex-storage from Puerto Cortés, Honduras, via multi-truck setup with a flow-metered mobile pumping unit to ports on the entire coast. Endofa say they will service the area with Intertek tested and certified ISO:2005 spec RMG380 and RME180 cSt product as well as MGO (DMA).

In the summer of 2015, Bunker company Endofa is now opening a new office in Denmark. The company, founded in 2012, also has offices in Houston, France and Angola and is registered in Dubai with its current headquarters - but the company would like to use its Danish office as headquarters over time, says Endofa partner Kenn Søndergaard. "Our long-term strategy is that, within the next two to four years, we'll turn the Danish office into our main offices. And there are three major reasons for that," he tells ShippingWatch 

Other changes in personnel have come in the Americas, where the company recently opened up in Panama.

Bunkering 
On May 1, 2014, Endofa is to become the first bunker supplier in West Africa to use a mass flow meter when transferring bunkers. A mass flow meter will be installed later this week on the Oleum-operated tanker MT Fair Artemis, paving the way for the first transfer to take place on 10 May 2014.

The Bunker Control System used will be provided by Insatech. It consists of a flow meter solution based on the Coriolis principle which provides correct mass measurements, temperature and density; thereby working to prevent fraudulent practices such as buy-back, bribes and signing off on false delivery notes.

References

Companies based in Houston